George L. Quiett Jr. (September 6, 1928 – December 28, 2003) was an American football coach.  He served as the head football coach at St. Augustine's University in Raleigh, North Carolina from 1961 to 1962 and North Carolina Central University in Durham, North Carolina from 1968 until 1972, compiling a career college football record of 42–21–2.  Quiett came to North Carolina College—as North Carolina Central University was known prior to 1969—as an assistant coach in 1963.

Head coaching record

College

References

1928 births
2003 deaths
North Carolina Central Eagles athletic directors
North Carolina Central Eagles football coaches
St. Augustine's Falcons football coaches